Haverkort is a surname. Notable people with the surname include: 

Ben Haverkort (born 1961), Dutch football player and referee
Kas Haverkort (born 2003), Dutch racing driver
Loes Haverkort (born 1981), Dutch actress